Simon Andrew Sturridge (born 9 December 1969) is an English former professional footballer who played as a striker. He made more than 250 appearances in the Football League for Birmingham City, Stoke City, Blackpool, Northampton Town and Shrewsbury Town.

Career
Sturridge was born in Birmingham and joined home-town club Birmingham City as a trainee in 1985 and turned professional in 1988. He played 186 games in all competitions for the club and scored the first goal of the 1991 Football League Trophy Final in which Birmingham beat Tranmere Rovers 3–2. After helping Birmingham gain promotion 1991–92 he joined Stoke City in September 1993.

Sturridge had to wait before he could become a regular in the Stoke first team as he made 20 appearances in 1993–94 of which he started nine and played in just 11 matches in 1994–95 meaning that he was rarely seen at the Victoria Ground. However his fortunes improved considerably in 1995–96 after manager Lou Macari brought in Mike Sheron and played him alongside Sturridge. The pair scored a combined 29 goals which saw Stoke reach the play-offs where they lost 1–0 to Leicester City. He suffered a serious injury at the start of the 1996–97 and after making fleeting appearances in the next two years he left for Northampton Town, having spent a short time out on loan at Blackpool. He played 19 times for the Cobblers helping them gain promotion in 1999–2000 and ended his career with an 11-game spell on loan at Shrewsbury Town.

Personal life
He is the brother of footballer Dean Sturridge and the uncle of footballer Daniel Sturridge, and is of Jamaican descent.

Career statistics

Honours
Birmingham City
 Football League Third Division runner-up: 1991–92
 Football League Trophy: 1991

Northampton Town
 Football League Third Division third-place promotion: 1999–2000

References

External links
 
 
 

Living people
1969 births
Footballers from Birmingham, West Midlands
English footballers
English people of Jamaican descent
Association football forwards
Birmingham City F.C. players
Stoke City F.C. players
Blackpool F.C. players
Northampton Town F.C. players
Shrewsbury Town F.C. players
English Football League players
Sturridge family
Black British sportsmen